Fabrice Balanche (born November 3, 1969 in Belfort, France) is a geographer and specialist in the political geography of Syria, Lebanon, Iraq and the Middle East in general.

Biography
In 2000, he defended his thesis The Alaouites, space and power in the Syrian coastal region: an ambiguous national integration, which was taken up and published in 2006 under the title The Alaouite region and the Syrian power.

He has a Doctorate in political geography from the University of Tours (2000) and an associate in geography.

He lived for ten years between Lebanon and Syria, countries which represent his main fields of study since 1990. His field of research focuses on the interaction between power, community and territory.

On November 29, 2013, he obtained the accreditation to direct research on the theme: The community factor in the analysis of Syrian and Lebanese space.

He is a lecturer in geography, authorized to supervise research, assistant professor of geography and director of research at the University of Lyon 2, where he headed the Research Group on the Mediterranean and the Middle East (GREMMO ) until the end of 2015, the date of cessation of its activities.

In 2012, he published the Atlas of the Arab Middle East, a work devoted to the four states of Bilad al-Sham which, according to Confluences Méditerranée, brings "in an editorial landscape already provided (...) a real added value" notably thanks to its “original and educational” cartography.

In 2015, Fabrice Balanche decided to leave Lyon and emigrate to the United States where he was a guest researcher at the Washington Institute for Near East Policy think-tank from 2015 to 2017, then at the Hoover Institution at Stanford University.

The Atlas of the Arab Near East was published in English by Brill under the title Atlas of the Near East: State Formation and the Arab-Israeli Conflict, 1918–2010. In February 2018, Fabrice Balanche published a book on the Syrian conflict in English: Sectarianism in Syria's Civil War , in which he explains the community aspects of the war in Syria.

Publications

Books
The Alaouite region and the Syrian power, editor Karthala, 2006, 313 p.
Atlas of the Arabic Near East, Paris-Sorbonne University Press RFI, 2012, 135 p.
Geopolitics of the Middle East, La Documentation française, Documentation photographique, Paris, 2014
Atlas of the Near East: State Formation and the Arab-Israeli Conflict, 1918–2010, Brill, Amsterdam, 2017
Sectarianism in Syria's Civil War , Washington Institute, 2018.

Collective works
Beyrouth entre mondialisation et crise syrienne conference of 23 October 2013 at Saint-Joseph University of Beirut, Géosphères (Annales Géographie, Vol 33-34, 2012-2013, in collaboration with Liliane Buccianti-Barakat.
An Arab Spring?: conference, Brest, 25–27 January 2012 / the Geopolitics of Brest; under the direction of Linda Gardelle; with contributions from Fabrice Balanche, Bernard Botiveau, Assia Boutaleb ... et al. / Paris: L'Harmattan, 2013.
Articles 
"The die is cast: the Kurds cross the Euphrates", in Syria: a hope? Les Cahiers de l'Orient n ° 122, spring 2016.
The battle of Aleppo is the center of the Syrian chessboard, February 5, 2016, Washington Institute for Near East Policy.
The die is cast, the Kurds cross the Euphrates, January 5, 2016, Washington Institute for the Near East Policy.
The Alawi community and the Syrian crisis, Middle East Institute, May 14, 2015.
Syria: civil war and the internationalization of the conflict, Eurorient, n ° 42, 2013.
Geography of the Syrian revolt, Outre Terre, n ° 27, September 2011.
Clientelism, communitarianism and territorial fragmentation in Syria, A Contrario, March 2009.
Syria, article on the Encyclopedia Universalis (collective writing)

Reception
He is regularly quoted in the written press on the subject of Syria in order to present his methods of mapping the Syrian civil war and to express his point of view on the situation.

He is recognized and named as an expert on the issues of development of the Middle East and the Syrian crisis and as "one of the leading French experts on Syria."

References

External links
 

1969 births
Living people
French geographers
French political scientists
People from Belfort
The Washington Institute for Near East Policy
University of Tours alumni
20th-century French people
21st-century French people